Dallas Shirley (June 7, 1913 in Washington, D.C. – March 1, 1994) was a basketball referee. He officiated more than 2000 basketball games in his 33-year career, which ended in 1966. He was the International Association of Approved Basketball Officials president from 1952 to 1953. He took part in the 1960 Summer Olympics in Rome, officiating basketball. He was a member of the first NBA officiating crew. He was enshrined in the Basketball Hall of Fame in 1980.

In 1994, Shirley donated a collection of documents and memorabilia to The George Washington University.  The collection includes pennants, patches, trophies, media guides, scrapbooks, and photographs.  It is currently under the care of the university's Special Collections Research Center, located in the Estelle and Melvin Gelman Library.

References

External links
Guide to the Dallas Shirley Papers, 1950-1982, Special Collections Research Center, Estelle and Melvin Gelman Library, The George Washington University
Basketball Hall of Fame page on Shirley

1913 births
1994 deaths
Basketball referees
George Washington Colonials men's basketball players
Naismith Memorial Basketball Hall of Fame inductees
National Basketball Association referees